Hassan Abdulrazzak (Arabic: حسن عبد الرزاق) is an Iraqi playwright and writer. He was born in Prague and studied molecular biology at university, obtaining a PhD from University College London in 1999. He has written a number of plays including Baghdad Wedding (2007), The Prophet (2012), Dhow Under The Sun, Catalina (both performed in 2015), Love, Bombs & Apples (2016), And Here I Am (2017). His plays have been produced in the UK, India and elsewhere. His writings have also been published in Banipal magazine. 

Awards include George Devine, Meyer-Whitworth and Arab British Centre's Award for Culture in 2013.

References

Year of birth missing (living people)
Living people
Alumni of University College London
Writers from Prague
Iraqi dramatists and playwrights
21st-century Iraqi writers